Grass crab spider may refer to:

 Oxytate
 Runcinia